Bonanza, Nicaragua is a town and a municipality in the North Caribbean Coast Autonomous Region of Nicaragua.

In 1996, the local authorities chose for the first time to vote.

Bonanza Municipality has a population of 30,536 (2021 estimate). The majority of the population are of mestiza origin and banana cultivation is important for the economy. The gold mining activity in Bonanza also attracted the population of many parts of the world in the search of the metal.

Transportation
The town is served by San Pedro Airport.

External links

Pictorial History of Bonanza - to view more photos of Bonanza mine and town between 1956 and 1961, compliments of Jim Drebert, go to this address to see Siuna area photos including Bonanza area:  Picasa - Jim Drebert

References 

Municipalities of the North Caribbean Coast Autonomous Region